Lafoensia pacari is a species of plant in the family Lythraceae. It is found in Brazil and Paraguay.

References

pacari
Least concern plants
Taxonomy articles created by Polbot